Glabrotheca is a genus of fungi within the class Sordariomycetes. The relationship of this taxon to other taxa within the class is unknown (incertae sedis). A monotypic genus, Glabrotheca contains the single species Glabrotheca aciculispora, described as new to science in 1993 by Puerto Rican mycologist Carlos E. Chardón.

References

Monotypic Sordariomycetes genera
Sordariomycetes enigmatic taxa